The 2020 Overwatch League season is the third season of the Overwatch League (OWL), a professional esports league for the video game Overwatch. The regular season began on February 8, 2020, and concluded on August 23. It was the first season that the league implemented a city-based, home-and-away format, with teams traveling between the global home venues to play regular season matches, making the OWL the first major esports league to feature such a format. However, this format was abandoned on March 31 due to the COVID-19 pandemic, and all matches were thereafter played online, with the league introducing three midseason tournaments.

An expanded 20-team postseason began on September 3. The Grand Finals bracket began on October 8, with the Grand Finals occurring on October 10. The San Francisco Shock won the Grand Finals over the Seoul Dynasty to win their second straight OWL championship.

League changes announced prior to season

Schedule 
Prior to the 2020 season, the majority of all OWL matches took place at Blizzard Arena in Burbank, California. In the 2019 season, three homestand weekends took place – the Dallas Fuel Homestand Weekend hosted by the Dallas Fuel, the Atlanta Reign Homestand Weekend hosted by the Atlanta Reign, and the Kit Kat Rivalry Weekend hosted by the Los Angeles Valiant – in efforts to test how a completely localized match schedule would work. For the 2020 season, the league adopted a "homestand" model. Every team was to host two to five homestands throughout the season. Each team would still play 28 matches and would be responsible for the selection and operation of their respective home venues. In addition to homestands, every team would have been required to host at least three team events for the community in their respective home cities. The season marked the first time that a major esports league featured a city-based, home-and-away format.

In the 2018 and 2019 seasons, the Overwatch League equally divided teams into two divisions – the Atlantic and Pacific. With the large amount of travelling that was to take place in the homestand model, the Atlantic and Pacific Divisions were renamed to the Atlantic and Pacific Conferences, and each conference was equally subdivided into two divisions, the Pacific East and West Divisions and the Atlantic North and South Divisions. The smaller divisions were implemented in efforts to reduce the amount of time and money spent on travel.

With the large amount of localized play and travel, the season was no longer split into four stages. Instead, a midseason tournament was to be held at the same time as the All-Star Weekend. The tournament would have featured the Atlantic and Pacific Conference leaders as well as the next best two teams, regardless of conference, based on the regular season standings through Week 10.

Rules 
In the prior seasons, the winner of each match was determined by a best-of-four map series, with a fifth tiebreaker map, if necessary. The league announced at BlizzCon that match winners would be determined by a first-to-three map series, similar to that of the 2019 playoffs. Activision Blizzard senior director of product strategy and business operations Jon Spector noted that due to the elimination of Stage Playoffs, map differential would be less important, as it is not very likely that many teams would have the same regular season record heading into the playoffs. Every match still begins with a control map followed by a rotation between assault, escort, and hybrid maps. Similar to previous seasons, should a match still be tied after four maps, a fifth tiebreaker map will be played on a control map.

After the announcement of hero pools in Overwatch for the competitive season starting in February 2020, the league announced that it would adopt the hero pool system beginning in the fourth week of play in March in effort to prevent stagnant metas. Each week, the league randomly selects one tank, two damage, and one support hero from a list of the most played heroes in the OWL from the previous two weeks of play; these heroes are then considered "banned" and cannot be selected during that week. Banned heroes cannot be banned in the immediately-following week. The hero pool system is only used in the regular season, and will not be enforced during the midseason tournament, the play-in tournament, and the playoffs.

Prize pool 
The Midseason Tournament champions will win $500,000, the runners-up will win $250,000, and the third and fourth place teams will earn $150,000. The All-Star event will have a prize pool for the first time, with a total pool of $250,000. For the postseason earnings, the Grand Champion team will earn $1.5 million (up from $1.1 million), second place will earn $800,000 (up from $600,000), third place will earn $500,000 (up from $450,000), fourth place will earn $300,000 (down from $350,000), fifth and sixth place will earn $200,000 (down from $300,000), and seventh and eighth place will earn $100,000 (down from $200,000).

Broadcasting 

Prior to the start of the season, several of the shoutcasters for the League, including Malik Forté, Auguste "Semmler" Massonnat, Christopher "MonteCristo" Mykles, Erik "DoA" Lonnquist, and Chris Puckett, left for various reasons ranging from dissatisfaction with their salaries to concerns over the new management of the league following Nate Nanzer's departure as league commissioner in 2019.

YouTube has replaced Twitch as exclusive broadcaster of the league, as part of a deal covering all Activision Blizzard esports events. The company also announced a deal to make Google Cloud Platform the preferred infrastructure provider for its game servers.

Rule and schedule changes due to COVID-19

Homestand events 
Due to the COVID-19 pandemic, Blizzard cancelled all four homestand events planned in China in February and March 2020. Four of the teams in the league are based in China, where travel restrictions and quarantines from the outbreak were enacted; the restrictions affected teams that were traveling to China to play matches there. Two of the Chinese teams, Guangzhou Charge and Shanghai Dragons, announced the relocation of their teams to South Korea, while the Chengdu Hunters remained in China. The cancelled matches were originally planned to be rescheduled in Seoul, South Korea during two weekends in March, with some matches being played during Seoul Dynasty's homestand event the same month. However, Blizzard later cancelled all South Korean events in March 2020, including the Dynasty homestand, over concerns of the outbreak. In March, French Health Minister Olivier Véran announced that all public gatherings of more than 1,000 people were banned in the country until April 15; the ban effectively cancelled the Paris Eternal homestand event that was scheduled to be held April 11–12. After the World Health Organization declared the COVID-19 virus a global pandemic on March 11, the Overwatch League announced that it would be cancelling all remaining scheduled live events in March and April.

Regions 
For the March and April matches, the league abandoned the Atlantic and Pacific conferences and instead divided teams into three groups based on geography – Atlantic, Pacific, and China – where teams would only play intra-regionally in an effort to reduce latency. Due to the inequity of the number of games played by each team, the All-Star Weekend was moved to the postseason, while the Midseason Tournament was canceled altogether. On March 31, the Overwatch League announced that they were abandoning the Homestand model entirely in favor of moving matches for the remainder of the season online.

Midseason tournaments 
On April 26, the league introduced the league announced a new tournament structure for the month of May called the May Melee. The league divided the 20 teams into two geographical regions, 13 in North America and 7 in Asia, where teams would only play interregionally. After three weeks of play, the top teams from each region played in their respective regional tournament. Teams earned $5000 for each win in the tournaments (with receiving a bye counting as a win) and earned a bonus win towards their regular season standings for each win after, and including, the quarterfinals. There were no hero pools for the tournaments, and winners were determined by which team won three maps, except for the finals, which were determined by which team won four maps. Following the conclusion of the May Melee, the league announced two more tournaments with the same ruleset for the months of June and July – the Summer Showdown and the Countdown Cup, respectively.

Season playoffs 
On July 15, the league announced its playoff format for the season. All 20 teams played in the postseason, with teams divided by the same two regions as the three midseason tournaments. The lowest seeds played in regional play-in tournaments. Twelve total teams qualified for the season playoffs split into two regional brackets. In the North America region, eight teams qualified for the North America Bracket, and in the Asia region, four teams qualified for the Asia Bracket. Each playoff bracket is a double-elimination tournament. However, the winners of the upper and lower finals in each respective bracket did not face each other. Instead, they qualified for the Grand Finals bracket – another double-elimination tournament. The winners of the upper and lower bracket in the Grand Finals bracket will play in the Grand Finals match.

Regular season 

North America

Asia

May Melee

Qualifiers 

North America

Asia

Knockouts 

North America

Asia

Summer Showdown

Qualifiers 

North America

 

 

Asia

Knockouts 

North America

Asia

Countdown Cup

Qualifiers 

North America

Asia

Knockouts 

North America

Asia

Postseason

Play-in tournaments 
The play-in tournaments were two regional single-elimination tournaments that took place September 3–5. All match winners were determined by which team wins three maps. The winners of each first round match advanced to the second round. The teams that qualified for a bye into the second round each selected which opponent they would face between the winners of the first round (or the Toronto Defiant or Seoul Dynasty in the North America and Asia region, respectively). The winners of the second round advanced to the playoffs.

North America bracket

Asia

Playoffs 

The playoffs will be contested by twelve teams – eight from the North America region and four from the Asia region. The top two teams from each region's respective playoff bracket will qualify for the Grand Finals bracket, where the final two teams in the Grand Finals bracket will play in the Grand Finals match.

North America

Asia bracket

Grand Finals bracket

Awards

Individual awards

Role Stars

Source:

All-Star Games 

The 2020 Overwatch League All-Star Games will be the Overwatch League's third edition of an all-star game that involves the All-Star players of the league. For the first time, the All-Stars will be split into two regions – Asia and North America. The Asia All-Star Game will be played on September 26, while the North America All-Star Game will be played on October 3. Both games will be the culmination of their respective All-Star Weekend, an event that consists of the Talent Takedown, a Widowmaker 1v1 tournament, as well as other various skills challenges.

Winnings
By League rules, at least 50% of these winnings are split among the team's members, the remaining going to the team's owner.

References

External links 
 
 

 
Overwatch
Overwatch League season 2020